Rolando Castellón, also known as Rolando Dionisio Castellón-Alegria (born 1937) is a Nicaraguan American painter, author, art historian, and curator. He was a well-known contributor to the arts of San Francisco, California and he has lived in Costa Rica since 2013.

Biography 
Rolando Castellón was born in 1937 in Managua, Nicaragua. He became a naturalized citizen of the United States in 1983. 

In 1966, he was a co-founder of the Casa Hispana de Bellas Artes in the Mission District of San Francisco. By 1970, Castellón was a co-founder of Galería de la Raza, alongside Ralph Maradiaga, Rupert García, Peter Rodríguez, Francisco X. Camplis, Gustavo Ramos Rivera, Carlos Loarca, Manuel Villamor, Robert Gonzales, Luis Cervantes, Chuy Campusano, and René Yañez.

He served as a curator at San Francisco Museum of Modern Art (SFMoMA), from 1972 to 1981; and at the Museum of Contemporary Art and Design, from 1994 to 1998.

His first retrospective art exhibition, Rolando Castellon: A Legacy of Mud, Post-Columbian Objects, 1981–1997 (1997) was held at the Art Institute of Chicago.

Bibliography

References

External links 
 SFMOMA 75th Anniversary: Rolando Castellón, conducted by Jess Rigelhaupt, 2007, by Regional Oral History Office, The Bancroft Library, University of California, Berkeley 

Living people
1937 births
American people of Nicaraguan descent
People from Managua
Nicaraguan painters
Hispanic and Latino American artists
American curators
Costa Rican curators